Seven Sacrifices (2013) is an album by Memorain.

Track listing

Personnel

Musicians 
 Andreas Boutos    – vocals
 Ilias Papadakis     – guitars
 Jason Mercury     – guitars
 Dimitris Anestis    – bass
 Tolis Mistiloglou    – drums

Guests 
 David Ellefson – bass on track 7
 Jed Simon – main solo on track 4
 Michael Gilbert – main solo on track 11

References

2013 albums
Memorain albums